Neuenhaus is a Samtgemeinde ("collective municipality") in the district of Bentheim, in Lower Saxony, Germany. Its seat is in the municipality Neuenhaus.

The Samtgemeinde Neuenhaus consists of the following municipalities:

 Esche 
 Georgsdorf 
 Lage 
 Neuenhaus
 Osterwald

Samtgemeinden in Lower Saxony